Acanthoma fissuratum is a cutaneous condition characterized by local thickening of the skin in response to pressure caused by an eyeglass frame.

See also 
 Seborrheic keratosis
 List of cutaneous conditions

References

External links 

Epidermal nevi, neoplasms, and cysts